Çilov-Neft Daşları (also, Cilov-Neft Daşları) is a municipality in the Pirallahy raion of Baku, Azerbaijan. It has a population of 1,797.  The municipality consists of an island with the three villages of Çilov and Neft Daşları, and Jiloy.

References

Municipalities of Baku